Nya Wermlands-Tidningen (meaning "The New Värmland Newspaper" in English), shortened NWT, is a Swedish local newspaper distributed in the provinces of Värmland, Dalsland and western Dalarna.

History and profile
The newspaper was founded as Wermlands Tidning (meaning "Newspaper of Värmland" in English) in Karlstad, Värmland, where it still has its headquarters. The first issue of the newspaper was published on 4 January 1837. While other newspapers already existed in the province, Wermlands Tidning quickly became the most printed.

On 2 May 2005, the format of the newspaper was changed from broadsheet to compact.

On 3 April 2007, the political position of the editorial page was changed from "moderate" (liberal-conservative) to "conservative", in what the newspaper stated was an attempt to mark its independence from any political parties (i.e. the Swedish Moderate Party). It's the only Swedish newspaper with the label "conservative".

References

External links
 Nya Wermlands-Tidningen

1837 establishments in Sweden
Publications established in 1837
Daily newspapers published in Sweden
Swedish-language newspapers
Mass media in Karlstad